Aşağı Mülkülü (also, Alagel-Myulkyulyu, Ashaga-Myul’kyuli, Ashagy Myul’kyulyu, Mülkülü, and Myulkyulyu) is a village and municipality in the Tovuz Rayon of Azerbaijan.  It has a population of 2,218.

References 

Populated places in Tovuz District